Gangstabilly is the 1998 debut album of American rock band Drive-By Truckers.  The album was recorded "live in the studio" over the course of two days and was produced by Andy Baker and Andy LeMaster. The album's cover art was created by Jim Stacy.  The album was rereleased on January 25, 2005 by  New West Records along with the band's second studio effort, Pizza Deliverance.

On the band's website, bandmember Patterson Hood said that "[Gangstabilly is] the most country of any of our albums." He goes on to admit that the record is "not our best album, but lots of fun and more than a little hint of the better things to come."  Hood has consistently stated that the song "The Living Bubba" is the best song he has ever written.

Hood wrote "Demonic Possession" while watching Pat Buchanan's televised speech at the 1996 Republican National Convention. "The Living Bubba" is a tribute to musician Gregory Dean Smalley.

Track listing
"Wife Beater" - 3:32 (Patterson Hood)
"Demonic Possession" - 4:51 (Hood)
"The Tough Sell" - 3:41 (Hood)
"The Living Bubba" - 5:56 (Hood)
"Late for Church" - 5:26 (Hood, Howell)
"Panties in Your Purse" - 4:41 (Mike Cooley)
"Why Henry Drinks" - 4:13 (Hood)
"18 Wheels of Love" - 4:10 (Hood)
"Steve McQueen" - 5:12 (Hood)
"Buttholeville" - 5:25 (Hood)
"Sandwiches for the Road" - 6:40 (Hood)

Personnel
 Mike Cooley - guitars, vocals, banjo (5)
 Patterson Hood - guitars, vocals, banjo
 John Neff - pedal steel guitar, vocals
 Adam Howell - upright bass, vocals
 Matt Lane - drums
 Barry Sell - mandolin (5), backing vocals (5)
 Redneck Greece - backing vocals (8)
 Jim Stacy - harmonica (9, 10)

References

1998 debut albums
Drive-By Truckers albums
New West Records albums
Albums produced by Andy LeMaster